Lophocampa romoloa is a moth of the family Erebidae. It was described by William Schaus in 1933. It is found in Brazil.

References

 Natural History Museum Lepidoptera generic names catalog

romoloa
Moths described in 1933